Frederick Kuys (21 March 1870 – 12 September 1953) was a South African cricketer who played in one Test in 1899.

References

External links

1870 births
1953 deaths
People from George, South Africa
South Africa Test cricketers
South African cricketers
Western Province cricketers
Cricketers from the Western Cape